87th is an 'L' station on the Chicago Transit Authority's Red Line. The station is located in the median of the Dan Ryan Expressway and serves the Chatham neighborhood. There are two entrances to the station, one on the south side of the 87th Street overpass which served as the only entrance from 1969 until 2006 and one on the north side of the overpass which was opened as part of the Dan Ryan Red Line Rehabilitation Project.

History

2013 renovation

In 2013, the station was renovated with a new elevator installed (along with Garfield and 63rd) as part of the Red Line South Reconstruction project and made all the stations on the Dan Ryan branch accessible.

Bus connections
CTA
29 State
87 87th (Owl Service)

Notes and references

Notes

References

External links 

87th/Dan Ryan Station Page at CTA official site
  87th/Dan Ryan Station Page at Chicago-L.org
87th Street entrance from Google Maps Street View

CTA Red Line stations
Railway stations in the United States opened in 1969
1969 establishments in Illinois